William Horne Dame (July 15, 1819 – August 16, 1884) was the first mayor of Parowan, Utah, a member of the Utah Territorial Legislature and Nauvoo Legion commander of the Iron  and Washington County Militia District. He was heavily involved in the Mountain Meadows massacre.

Early life
William H. Dame was born in Farmington, New Hampshire. He joined the Church of Jesus Christ of Latter Day Saints in 1840.

Career

Death-1877 Utah.  Firing Squad.

References

Ronald W. Walker, Richard E. Turley Jr. and Glen M. Leonard. Massacre at Mountain Meadows. p. 55-56.

External links
 William Horne Dame archival materials in the L. Tom Perry Special Collections, Harold B. Lee Library, Brigham Young University

1819 births
1884 deaths
Converts to Mormonism
Mayors of places in Utah
Members of the Utah Territorial Legislature
19th-century American politicians
Mormon pioneers
Latter Day Saints from New Hampshire
People from Parowan, Utah
People from Farmington, New Hampshire
Latter Day Saints from Utah